Ameivula nativo is a species of teiid lizard endemic to Brazil.

References

nativo
Reptiles described in 1997
Lizards of South America
Reptiles of Brazil
Taxa named by Carlos Frederico Duarte Rocha
Taxa named by Helena de Godoy Bergallo
Taxa named by Denise Maria Peccinini-Seale